The Midland Terminal Railroad Depot in Victor, Colorado, was built in 1895 for the Midland Terminal Railway.

Colorado Midland Railroad established the Midland Terminal Railroad for a spur line between Divide and Cripple Creek and then to Victor. This allowed for ore to be transported via train rather than wagons for processing in Old Colorado City.

The brick depot contains features common to its type and period of construction including the wide overhanging eaves, the central bay office window, and the large freight doors.

See also
National Register of Historic Places listings in Teller County, Colorado

References

External links

Buildings and structures in Teller County, Colorado
Former railway stations in Colorado
Railway stations in the United States opened in 1895
National Register of Historic Places in Teller County, Colorado
Railway stations on the National Register of Historic Places in Colorado
1895 establishments in Colorado
History of Teller County, Colorado
Individually listed contributing properties to historic districts on the National Register in Colorado